The following squads were named for the 1924 Summer Olympics tournament.

Belgium

Head coach:  William Maxwell

Bulgaria

Head coach:  Leopold Nitsch

6 players (Denev, Krapchanski, Lyutskanov, Stavrev, V. Stoyanov, Tsvetkov)
were included in the formal application, but due to financial constraints in the Bulgarian Football Union,  did not go to Paris

Czechoslovakia

Head coach:  Jaroslav Bezecný

Egypt

Head coach:  Hussein Hegazi

Abaza Sayed Fahmy:
In the lists of FIFA - the player Sayed ABAZA played in tournaments of 1920 and 1928

The same player in a football tournament in 1924 was in the reserve team in Egypt.
Everywhere on the sites FIFA writing given to the player - Abaza Sayed FAHMY

And so for all sites, the same footballer is written everywhere in different ways

Estonia

Head coach:  Ferenc Kónya

Note:
6 players - Brenner, Einman, Gerassimov, Javorsky, Kichlefeldt and Lello - although included in the official squad submitted to FIFA, did not travel to France and stayed in Estonia in reserve.

France

Head coach:  Charles Griffiths

Hungary

Head coach:  Gyula Kiss

Irish Free State

Head coach:  Charles Harris

Note: 5 players (Cowzer, Heaney, Lea, Aungier, Healy) did not travel to France and stayed in Ireland on reserve.

Italy

Head coach:  Vittorio Pozzo

Latvia

Head coach:  Juris Rēdlihs

Note: 5 players (I.Greble, Hammers, Lauks, Timpers, Viņķis) did not travel to France and stayed in Latvia on reserve.

Lithuania

Luxembourg

Head coach:  Batty Schroeder

Note: 6 players (Elter, Ginter, Feller, Kremer, Lefèvre, Stirn) did not travel to France and stayed in Luxembourg on reserve.

Netherlands

Head coach:  William Townley

Poland

Head coach:  Adam Obrubański

Romania

Head coach:  Adrian Suciu

Spain

Head coach:  Pedro Parages

Sweden

Head coach:  József Nagy

Switzerland

Head coach:  Edward Duckworth

Turkey

Head coach:  Billy Hunter

Uruguay

Head coach:  Ernesto Figoli

United States

Head coach: George Burford

Yugoslavia

Head coach:  Todor Sekulić

References

Sources
 Sports-reference 
 FIFA
 RSSSF
 List of Luxembourgian olympic footballers at ALO
 List of Swedish medalists at the 1924 Summer Olympics, Sveriges Olympiska Kommitté
 Turkey national football team: match reports 1923-1924, Walter Verani, Erdinç Sivritepe and Turkish Soccer
 Match report at FFF
 Match report at FFF
 Match report at Serbian football federation
 Latvijas futbolisti piedalīsies Berlines Olimpiādē?,  Arnolds Šmits
 
 (archive) Ireland’s footballers at the Paris Olympics, 1924

1924 Summer Olympics
Football at the 1924 Summer Olympics